Shinnosuke Oka (born 31 October 2003) is a Japanese artistic gymnast. In 2019, he won two gold medals, one silver medal and one bronze medal at the 2019 Junior World Artistic Gymnastics Championships held in Győr, Hungary. He won the gold medal both in the team event and in the men's all-around event. He won the silver medal in the pommel horse event and the bronze medal in the parallel bars event.

References

External links 

 

Living people
2003 births
Place of birth missing (living people)
Japanese male artistic gymnasts
Medalists at the Junior World Artistic Gymnastics Championships
21st-century Japanese people